Acho is a surname. Notable people with the surname include:

Emmanuel Acho (born 1990), American football player
James Acho, American sportswriter
Sam Acho (born 1988), American football player

as first name:

Acho (vice-chancellor), 13th-century Hungarian cleric

See also
 Acho people, a protohistorical band of Lipan Apache
Plaza de toros de Acho, bullring in Lima, Peru